Traute Foresti (15 March 1915 in Payerbach – 3 April 2015 in Vienna) was an Austrian poet and actress.

References

1915 births
2015 deaths
Austrian centenarians
Austrian women poets
20th-century Austrian actresses
20th-century poets
20th-century women writers
Women centenarians